Talvin Singh OBE (born 1970) is an English musician, producer, and composer. A tabla player, he is known for creating an innovative fusion of Indian classical music and drum and bass. Singh is generally considered involved with an electronica subgenre called Asian Underground, and more recently as Indian and/or Asian electronica.

After collaborating with Siouxsie and the Banshees and Björk in the early 1990s, Singh released his debut album Ok which received the Mercury Music Prize in 1999.

Singh has since collaborated with a variety of acts including Madonna and Massive Attack.

Early life and career
Singh grew up in Leytonstone and began playing the tablas as a child. At the age of 16, Singh went to India for two years where he studied tabla under Sangeet Acharya Ustad Lachman Singh Seen of Punjab Gharana. He then returned to the UK after just one year. In spite of this classical training, Singh's tabla playing was not accepted by British promoters of classical Indian music, as he incorporated too strongly his western influences. By the late 1980s, Singh had decided to turn towards the fusion of sounds. In 1991, he came to prominence by both playing tabla and singing on the "Kiss Them for Me" single by Siouxsie and the Banshees : the single peaked in the Billboard Hot 100 at number 23. Singh then became the sixth member of the Banshees and took part with them as second headliners of the inaugural Lollapalooza tour. Two years later in 1993, he was recruited by Björk to be her percussionist and director on her 1993 album, Debut.

In late 1995, Singh founded the Anokha club night with promoter Sweety Kapoor at East London's Blue Note, where drum'n'bass DJs and South Asian punk bands went head to head with the amped-up sounds of his tabla and percussion. Producer and DJ State of Bengal (Sam Zaman) soon became the core of Anokha alongside Singh & Kapoor, and his sets alongside Singhs help to inspire a whole generation.

Singh and Zaman would make fresh tracks, cutting them on Vinyl press hours before the Monday Anokha sessions where they would be showcased.

Guest spots by LTJ Bukem and others made Anokha a Monday-night hotspot in London, and Singh signed to Island for an Anokha compilation including several of his own productions. He worked as a remixer, for Blondie on their "Maria" single".

In 1998, Singh released his solo debut album, Ok. The record was critically acclaimed and received the prestigious Mercury Music Prize in 1999. That same year, he also collaborated with David Sylvian. In 2000, he worked with Madonna for her album, Music.

Style and influences
Singh is an accomplished tabla player, electronic musician, music theorist, record producer and DJ. As a solo artist, he is perhaps best known as the father of modern Asian electronica music, though he is also a highly celebrated tabla player, record producer and visual practitioner.

Drawing inspiration from the classical Indian arts, Singh first came to prominence as a tabla percussionist in the 1980s London music scene. Whilst still in his mid-teens, Singh travelled to India to earn pupillage from Sangeet Acharya Ustad Lachman Singh Seen, master tabla maestro of the Punjab school. This period made an indelible mark on the young artist and he has since continued to practice and perform the art form internationally. Singh's collaborations with Indian classical musicians include Ustad Sultan Khan, Rakesh Churasia, Ustad Imrat Khan and Ustad Amjad Ali Khan amongst scores of others.

Singh also became involved in experimental music collaborations beginning in the late 1980s, working with Sun Ra and Courtney, which helped to popularise the burgeoning Asian underground sub-culture movement.

Singh is notable for re-introducing the concepts of Indian classical music to western pop, dance and jazz genres in the late 1980s and early 1990s. Singh's solo album credits include critical and commercial successes Ok (1998)—which won the UK's two most prestigious music prizes, 'The South Bank Prize' and the Mercury Prize in 1999. Ok, his groundbreaking 1998 debut release, was recorded in Mumbai, Madras, Okinawa, New York and London, featuring contributions from Bill Laswell, Ryuichi Sakamoto, Ustad Sultan Khan and the Madras Philharmonic Orchestra amongst others.

Singh has pursued several artistic ventures parallel to and in conjunction with his music career, including creating the seminal London club ANOKHA, performing at the Tate Gallery in London, creating a sound installation at the Frith Street Gallery in London and composing music for various experimental dance, theatre and film projects. In 1990 Singh conceived the Tablatronic, a hybrid electronic/analog tabla (drum) which uses a rare internal microphone system. However, in a 2017 interview, he said he "did not do fusion music" and disliked the way Indian musicians felt they had to do fusion music.

Awards
In 2010, Talvin Singh won an award at the UK Asian Music Awards (UK AMAs) for his "Commitment to Scene". He was awarded an OBE in the 2014 Birthday Honours.

Discography

Albums
Drum + Space (as Calcutta Cyber Cafe) (1996) Omni Records Ltd
OK (1998) Island
Ha (2001) Island
Sweet Box (2008)

Compilations
Anokha - Soundz of the Asian Underground (1997) Island
Back to Mine, Volume 8 (2001) DMC

Collaborations and original contributions
 Siouxsie and the Banshees, "Kiss Them for Me" and "Silver Waterfalls" on Superstition (1991)
 Keith LeBlanc, Time Traveller (1992)
 Dub Syndicate, Live at the Town and Country Club
 Björk, Debut (1993)
 Abracatabla (1994) Sampling CD (time and Space)
The Future Sound of London, "Life Form Ends" on Lifeforms (1994)
 Little Axe – The Wolf That House Built (1994)
 Bim Sherman – Miracle (1996)
 Nusrat Fateh Ali Khan – Star rise (1997) Real World.
 Duran Duran, "Out of My Mind", Medazzaland and The Saint (1997)
 David Sylvian – Dead Bees on a Cake (1999)
 Madonna, "Cyber-Raga", Music (2000).
 Master Musicians of Jajouka (2000)
 Randall & Hopkirk (Deceased) – Original soundtrack (2000) Island.
 Remixsingh Ok (2001) Island / Japan Import.
 Voxygen, a commission by English National Opera.
 Talvin Singh & Rakesh Chaurasia – Vira (2002) Sona Rupa UK.
 Tabla Beat Science – Tala Matrix (2002) Palm Pictures.
 Richard Ashcroft – Human Conditions (2002)
 Msoke – Murder Time (2003) Buback
 Talvin Singh & Sangat – Songs for the Inner World (2004) Live French Import.
 Talvin Singh feat. Amar-Jaan
 Smadj – Selin (2009)
 Talvin Singh & Niladri Kumar – Together (2011)
 "D.U.S.T." – Talvin Singh feat. Frame/Frame (2014)

Remixes
 Blondie – "Maria"
 Madonna – "Nothing Really Matters"
 Najma Akhtar – "Ghoom Charakhana"
 Björk – "Possibly Maybe"
 Ryuichi Sakamoto – "Grief"
 John Martyn – "Sunshines Better"
 Sarah McLachlan – "Answer"
 Natacha Atlas – "Duden"
 Asa-Chang & Junray – "12 Bushi"
 Alisha's Attic – "Air We Breathe"
 Najma Atish – "Ghoom Charakhana (Talvin Singh mix)"
 Bill Laswell and William S. Burroughs – "The Western Lands"
 Otm Shank  – "Maharaja" (Talvin Singh Remix) (2021)

References

External links
 – official site 

1970 births
Living people
English people of Indian descent
English people of Punjabi descent
Club DJs
Remixers
English Sikhs
People from Leytonstone
English electronic musicians
Tabla players
Asian Underground musicians
Island Records artists
Officers of the Order of the British Empire
21st-century drummers